Heterocapsa is a genus of dinoflagellates belonging to the family Heterocapsaceae.

The genus has cosmopolitan distribution.

Species:

Heterocapsa arctica 
Heterocapsa minima 
Heterocapsa niei 
Heterocapsa niei 
Heterocapsa pygmaea 
Heterocapsa rotundata 
Heterocapsa triquetra

References

Dinophyceae
Dinoflagellate genera